The Springfield Thunderbirds are a minor league professional ice hockey team in the American Hockey League that began play for the 2016–17 season. They are the affiliate of the National Hockey League's St. Louis Blues. Based in Springfield, Massachusetts, the Thunderbirds play their home games at the MassMutual Center.

History
In May 2016, following the relocation of the Springfield Falcons to Tucson, Arizona, after the team was sold to the Arizona Coyotes, the AHL's Portland Pirates were sold to a Springfield-based group who relocated the franchise to Springfield for the 2016–17 season.

The new owners were a consortium of local business interests seeking to keep hockey in Springfield, and included Paul Picknelly, owner of the Springfield Marriott and member of the family-owning Peter Pan Bus Lines, as well as several local hotel owners.  A team from Springfield has taken the ice in the AHL and its predecessors for all but seven years since 1926, and in every season since 1954.

The Thunderbirds inherited the Florida Panthers' affiliation with the Pirates. The Panthers assigned their assistant general manager, Eric Joyce, to be Springfield's general manager and named Geordie Kinnear as the new head coach.  The Thunderbirds also named Bruce Landon, the Falcons' and Indians' longtime president and general manager, as a consultant, while hiring AHL executive Nathan Costa as their executive vice-president in charge of business operations.  The team's new name was announced at a press conference on June 15, 2016. Team management explained that Thunderbirds invokes both the mythological Thunderbird and the United States Air Force presence in the region, such as the Barnes and Westover Air Reserve Bases.

The Thunderbirds played their first game on October 15, 2016, a 4–2 loss to the Lehigh Valley Phantoms. Anthony Greco scored the first goal in team history. On October 22, 2016, the Thunderbirds played their home opener, a 5–4 win, against the St. John's IceCaps. Dryden Hunt scored the first goal on home ice, and MacKenzie Weegar scored the game-winning goal in overtime in front of a sellout crowd of 6,793. While the inaugural season did not result in a playoff berth, average attendance rose from 3,108 in the Falcons' last season to 4,618 and including three sellouts.

On February 17, 2018, it was announced that the Springfield Thunderbirds and the MassMutual Center would host the 2019 AHL All-Star Classic and Skills contest, to take place on January 27–28, 2019. This marked the first AHL All-Star Game in Springfield since 1959. MGM Springfield served as the host of the event. The Western Conference was victorious in the skills competition, while the Central Division defeated the Atlantic Division in the championship game of the round-robin event. Both events were sold out.

On March 6, 2020, the Springfield Thunderbirds announced a five-year affiliation deal with the St. Louis Blues of the NHL starting from the 2020–21 season.  The affiliation with Florida did not yield any playoff appearances, but saw a number of players recalled to the NHL. The team had seen attendance rise in each of its four seasons. Drew Bannister was announced as the second head coach in team history coming from the Blues' previous affiliate, the San Antonio Rampage. However, due to the ongoing restrictions during the COVID-19 pandemic, the Thunderbirds were one of three teams that opted out of the 2020–21 AHL season.

In the 2021-22 AHL season, with COVID restrictions lifted and the Thunderbirds having by far their best season, they led the Atlantic Division with a 43-26-4-3 record, with a team record average attendance of 5,375.  They made the playoffs for the first time, sweeping the Wilkes-Barre/Scranton Penguins and the Charlotte Checkers in the first two rounds before winning the third against the Laval Rocket in seven games.  In the Thunderbirds' first Calder Cup Finals appearance, they were defeated by the Chicago Wolves in five games.

The market was previously home to:
Springfield Indians (1926–1994)
Springfield Falcons (1994–2016)

Season-by-season results

Players

Current roster
Updated March 18, 2023.

|}

Team captains
 Brent Regner: 2016–2017
 Paul Thompson: 2018–2020
 Tommy Cross: 2021–present

Retired numbers
#2:  Eddie Shore
#23:  Rob Murray

Note: Shore's number was retired by the Springfield Indians, and Murray's by the Springfield Falcons; the Thunderbirds continue to honor both numbers.  Former AHL president Jack Butterfield and vice president Gordie Anziano, longtime Springfield residents, as well as former Indians' general manager and Falcons founder Bruce Landon, and Willie O'Ree, the first African American to play in the AHL, have been honored with banners raised with the retired numbers.

Notable alumni
Players playing at least 100 games in Springfield and 100 games in major leagues.

Josh Brown
Bobby Farnham
Dryden Hunt
Juho Lammikko
Steven Santini

Team records
As of 2021–22 season.
Single season
Goals: Anthony Greco, 30 (2018–19)
Goals by a Rookie: Owen Tippett, 19 (2019-20)
Power Play Goals: Nathan Walker, 10 (2021–22)
Short Handed Goals: Anthony Greco, 6 (2017–18)
Assists: Sam Anas, 44 (2021–22)
Points: Sam Anas, 64 (2021–22)
Penalty Minutes: Sena Acolatse, 147 (2016–17)
Appearances by a Goalie: Samuel Montembeault, 41 (2017–18)
GAA: Charlie Lindgren 2.21 (2021–22)
SV%: Charlie Lindgren .925 (2021-22)
Shutouts: Harri Sateri, 4 (2017–18)

Career
Games: 261, Anthony Greco
Penalty Minutes: 238, Paul Thompson
Goaltending Wins: 31, Samuel Montembeault
Shutouts: 4 Harri Sateri & Sam Montembeault
Goals: 85, Anthony Greco
Assists: 78, Dryden Hunt
Points: 157, Anthony Greco
Power Play Goals: 20, Dryden Hunt
Short Handed Goals: 16, Anthony Greco

References

External links
Springfield Thunderbirds Official Website

 
Florida Panthers minor league affiliates
Ice hockey teams in Massachusetts
Sports teams in Springfield, Massachusetts
Ice hockey clubs established in 2016
2016 establishments in Massachusetts